Hof is a Dutch  and German toponymic surname. Notable people with the surname include:

Anne Catherine Hof Blinks (1903–1995), American botanist
Bennie Hofs (1946–2017), Dutch footballer 
Dennis Hof (1946-2018), American brothel owner in Nevada
Erich Hof (1936–1995), Austrian footballer and coach
Jennifer Hof (born 1991), German fashion model
Heinz Hof (born 1944), pseudonym of Werner Janssen, Dutch/German philosopher and poet
Marjolijn Hof (born 1956), Dutch writer
Mark-Peter Hof (born 1990), Dutch basketball player
Norbert Hof (born 1944), Austrian retired footballer
Samuel Hof (1870-1937), US Army major general
Wim Hof (born 1959), Dutch daredevil nicknamed "the Iceman" for his resistance to extreme cold

See also
Hoff (surname), North German, Dutch, and Danish surname
Hoffman (disambiguation), German surname
Van 't Hof, Dutch surname
Hof (disambiguation)

References

Dutch-language surnames
Dutch toponymic surnames
German toponymic surnames